Joyce may refer to:

People
 Joyce (name), list of people and fictional characters with the given name or surname
Joyce, (born 1948), Brazilian singer-songwriter
 James Joyce (1882–1941), Irish modernist writer

Places
 Joyce, Washington, an unincorporated community in the United States
 Mount Joyce, Victoria Land, Antarctica
 Joyce Peak, Ross Island, off the coast of Victoria Land
 Joyce Glacier, Victoria Land
 Lake Joyce, Victoria Land
 Joyce Country, a region in counties Galway and Mayo in Ireland
 5418 Joyce, a main-belt asteroid

Business
 Joyce, house brand of Hong Kong company Joyce Boutique
 JB Joyce & Co, an English clockmaker
 Joyces 365, a supermarket chain based in Galway, Ireland
 Amstrad PCW personal computer, sold under license in Europe as the "Joyce"

Other uses
 Hurricane Joyce (disambiguation), multiple storms
 USS Joyce (DE-317), a destroyer escort that served in World War II
 Joyce (programming language)
 Joyce Theater, in the Manhattan borough of New York City in the United States
 Joyce Foundation, a charitable foundation based in Chicago, Illinois, United States

See also
 Joice (disambiguation)